Firozabad Assembly constituency is one of the 403 constituencies of the Uttar Pradesh Legislative Assembly, India. It is a part of the Firozabad  district and one of the five assembly constituencies in the Firozabad Lok Sabha constituency. First election in this assembly constituency was held in 1957 after the "DPACO (1956)" (delimitation order) was passed in 1956. After the "Delimitation of Parliamentary and Assembly Constituencies Order" was passed in 2008, the constituency was assigned identification number 97.

Wards  / Areas
Extent  of Firozabad Assembly constituency is Firozabad MB, Humayunpur (OG), Nagla  Bhau (OG), Mirza  Nagla (OG), Ambedkar  Park (OG), Ramgarh Nagla Kothi (OG), Asafabad (OG), Kakarahu (OG), Lalpur  (OG) & Sukhmalpur Nizamabad (CT) of Firozabad Tehsil.

Members of the Legislative Assembly

Election results

2022 

 
 
 

 

-->

2017

See also
Firozabad district
Firozabad Lok Sabha constituency
Sixteenth Legislative Assembly of Uttar Pradesh
Uttar Pradesh Legislative Assembly
Vidhan Bhawan

References

External links
 

Assembly constituencies of Uttar Pradesh
Firozabad
Constituencies established in 1956